The Herald-Citizen is a daily newspaper in Cookeville, Tennessee, United States. It has been published since 1903.

See also

 List of newspapers in Tennessee

References

External links
 Official Website

1903 establishments in Tennessee
Newspapers published in Tennessee
Daily newspapers published in the United States
Publications established in 1903